Being Lara Bingle was an Australian reality television series that premiered on 12 June 2012 on Network Ten. The series followed the misadventures of model and minor television personality, Lara Bingle.

In April 2013, Network Ten expressed that "the extreme youth focus that led to programs like (the similarly unsuccessful) The Shire and Being Lara Bingle being commissioned is not quite right for us" and that Ten would now move on from that focus.

Cast
 Lara Bingle Worthington – Model and TV personality
 Hermione Underwood – Lara's former manager and best friend
 Josh Bingle – Lara's brother
 Sharon Bingle – Lara's mother

Ratings
The series aired in the 8:00 pm–8:30 pm timeslot on Tuesdays. Ratings aggregated by OzTam subsequent to the premiere of the series indicate that the premiere episode received an estimated viewership of 925,000 viewers, during which a peak of 1.3 million was reached.

Notes

Location
The reality series was filmed at Bondi Beach in New South Wales and other locations including Los Angeles, Melbourne, India, and New Zealand.

See also
 WAG Nation
 The Stafford Brothers

References

Network 10 original programming
2012 Australian television series debuts
2012 Australian television series endings
2010s Australian reality television series
English-language television shows